The Campeonato Nacional da Guiné-Bissau is the highest division in football in Guinea-Bissau. The league was formed in 1975.

Campeonato Nacional da Guiné-Bissau – 2021−22 clubs
AC de Bissorã (Bissorã)
AFC Nhacra (Nhacra)
Binar FC (Binar)
CF Os Balantas (Mansôa)
Cumpelum FC (Bissau)
Cuntum FC (Cuntum)
FC Canchungo (Canchungo)
FC Sonaco (Sonaco)
Flamengo FC (Pefine)
Lagartos FC (Bambadinca)
Massaf FC (Cacine)
Pelundo FC (Pelundo)
SC Portos de Bissau (Bissau)
Sport Bissau e Benfica (Bissau)
Sporting Clube de Bafatá (Bafatá)
Sporting Clube de Bissau (Bissau)
União Desportiva Internacional (Bissau)

Previous champions

1975 : CF Os Balantas (Mansôa)
1976 : União Desportiva Internacional (Bissau)
1977 : Sport Bissau e Benfica (Bissau)
1978 : Sport Bissau e Benfica (Bissau)
1979 : title not given
1980 : Sport Bissau e Benfica (Bissau)
1981 : Sport Bissau e Benfica (Bissau)
1982 : Sport Bissau e Benfica (Bissau)
1983 : Sporting Clube de Bissau (Bissau)
1984 : Sporting Clube de Bissau (Bissau)
1985 : União Desportiva Internacional (Bissau)
1986 : Sporting Clube de Bissau (Bissau)
1986–87 : Sporting Clube de Bafatá (Bafatá)
1987–88 : Sport Bissau e Benfica (Bissau)
1988–89 : Sport Bissau e Benfica (Bissau)
1989–90 : Sport Bissau e Benfica (Bissau)
1990–91 : Sporting Clube de Bissau (Bissau)
1991–92 : Sporting Clube de Bissau (Bissau)
1993 : SC Portos de Bissau (Bissau)
1993–94 : Sporting Clube de Bissau (Bissau)
1995 : title not given
1996 : ADR Desportivo de Mansabá (Mansabá)
1997 : Sporting Clube de Bissau (Bissau)
1998 : Sporting Clube de Bissau (Bissau)
1999 : no championship
2000 : Sporting Clube de Bissau (Bissau)
2001 : no championship
2002 : Sporting Clube de Bissau (Bissau)
2002–03 : União Desportiva Internacional (Bissau)
2003–04 : Sporting Clube de Bissau (Bissau)
2004–05 : Sporting Clube de Bissau (Bissau)
2005–06 : CF Os Balantas (Mansôa)
2006–07 : Sporting Clube de Bissau (Bissau)
2007–08 : Sporting Clube de Bafatá (Bissau)
2008–09 : CF Os Balantas (Mansôa)
2009–10 : Sport Bissau e Benfica (Bissau)
2010–11 : Atlético Clube de Bissorã (Bissorã)
2011–12 : no competition due to financial problems
2013 : CF Os Balantas (Mansôa)
2014 : Nuno Tristão FC (Bula)
2015 : Sport Bissau e Benfica (Bissau)
2016 : no competition after the 7th round, it was abandoned in May due to financial problems
2016–17 : Sport Bissau e Benfica (Bissau)
2017–18 : Sport Bissau e Benfica (Bissau)
2018–19 : União Desportiva Internacional (Bissau)
2019–20 : abandoned 
2020–21 : Sporting Clube de Bissau (Bissau)

Performance By Club

Topscorers

See also
Acaja Club
Ajuda United

References

External links
Football for the Peoples. Guinea-Bissau
RSSSF competition history

 
Guinea-Bissau
Recurring sporting events established in 1975